Igerna bimaculicollis is a species of leafhopper.

References 

Insects described in 1855
Megophthalminae